Northview is an unincorporated community and census-designated place (CDP) in Kent County in the U.S. state of Michigan.  The population was 14,541 at the 2010 census.  The community is located mostly within Plainfield Township with a very small portion extending into Grand Rapids Township to the south. 

The community is part of the Grand Rapids metropolitan area and borders the city of Grand Rapids to the south.

Geography

The CDP is almost entirely within Plainfield Charter Township and consists of the area north of the boundary with Grand Rapids and Grand Rapids Township and south of the Grand River. It also includes a small portion of Grand Rapids Township around the southern end of Dean Lake. It is considered part of the urbanized area around Grand Rapids.

The CDP takes its name from the Northview Public Schools district, although the district includes a larger portion of Grand Rapids Township and a small area of the city of Grand Rapids.

Major highways
 , known locally as Beltline Avenue, runs south–north through the center of the community.  M-44 also contains a connector route within the community that links it to Interstate 96 to the south in Grand Rapids.

Demographics

As of the census of 2000, there were 14,730 people, 5,673 households, and 3,942 families residing in the CDP. The racial makeup of the CDP was 94.38% White, 1.94% African American, 0.37% Native American, 1.08% Asian, 0.08% Pacific Islander, 0.81% from other races, and 1.34% from two or more races. Hispanic or Latino of any race were 2.12% of the population.

There were 5,673 households, out of which 36.2% had children under the age of 18 living with them, 56.4% were married couples living together, 10.1% had a female householder with no husband present, and 30.5% were non-families. 25.8% of all households were made up of individuals, and 7.4% had someone living alone who was 65 years of age or older.  The average household size was 2.59 and the average family size was 3.15.

In the CDP, the population was spread out, with 28.1% under the age of 18, 9.4% from 18 to 24, 28.8% from 25 to 44, 23.4% from 45 to 64, and 10.3% who were 65 years of age or older.  The median age was 35 years. For every 100 females, there were 97.1 males.  For every 100 females age 18 and over, there were 92.1 males.

The median income for a household in the CDP was $46,888, and the median income for a family was $54,756. Males had a median income of $41,295 versus $28,870 for females. The per capita income for the CDP was $21,215.  About 4.5% of families and 6.0% of the population were below the poverty line, including 6.0% of those under age 18 and 4.9% of those age 65 or over.

Notable residents 
 Stacey Haiduk, actor in NBC's Heroes and seaQuest DSV
 Gary Hogeboom, former Dallas Cowboys Quarterback and Survivor: Guatemala contestant

References

Unincorporated communities in Kent County, Michigan
Census-designated places in Michigan
Grand Rapids metropolitan area
Unincorporated communities in Michigan
Census-designated places in Kent County, Michigan